Mahendra Hardia is the current Member of Legislative Assembly from Indore Constituency 5 of Madhya Pradesh. He is elected from No. 5 constituency of Indore for the record third time. His notable works as an ex health minister includes the implementation of Janani Suraksha Yojna, a program of Madhya Pradesh government to provide healthcare facilities to pregnant women.

Early life and education
Hardia was born to Keval Chand Hardia, a businessman in Indore. He received his education in Indore at Holkar college and completed his B.Sc. Later he completed his M.A. from Indore University (Currently known as Devi Ahilya University).

Political career
Hardia started his career as a youth leader in Indore University. He later joined BJP and was promoted to the post of Health minister in Shivraj Government.

References

Living people
Madhya Pradesh MLAs 2008–2013
Politicians from Indore
Bharatiya Janata Party politicians from Madhya Pradesh
1953 births